Runo (Welsh: Rhun map Peredyr) was a legendary king of the Britons as recounted by Geoffrey of Monmouth. He was the son of King Peredurus and was succeeded by his cousin Gerennus.

References

Legendary British kings
3rd-century BC rulers